Grant Lightbown is a former association football player who represented New Zealand at international level.

Lightbown made a solitary official international appearance for New Zealand in a 1–2 loss to Australia on 15 May 1991.

References 

Year of birth missing (living people)
Living people
New Zealand association footballers
New Zealand international footballers
Association footballers not categorized by position